Blacksmiths emerged in West Africa around 1500 BCE. They are feared in some societies for their skill in metalworking, considered a form of magic. They are also much admired and hold high social status. Because the trade is so specialised and dangerous, blacksmiths are often requisitioned by towns and villages where there are none. Other ironworking societies such as the Mandé peoples of Mali and the Bamana exist in West Africa.

Nigeria
The Nok people of Nigeria show the art of blacksmiths, which date back to the sixth century BC. Ironworking made farming, hunting, and war much more efficient. Iron allowed for greater growth in societies. With the ability to support larger communities came social growth and the development of large kingdoms, which spread across Western Africa.

Throughout Nigeria two more very important West African civilizations arose. The Ife and the Oyo people of Yorubaland are very similar in their spiritual and ritual beliefs. Both base their existence around ironworking. To these African civilizations, iron had become the key to their development and survival, and it was worshiped as such. The Ife and Oyo people believe that the blacksmith has the power to express the spirit of Ogun, the god of iron, because they create iron, which is the foundation for their survival.

Spirituality and religion

Ogun, the god of iron

Ogun, the god of iron, is one of the pantheon of "orisa" traditionally worshipped by the Yoruba of Nigeria. Ogun is the god of iron and metalworking and was himself a user of iron as a blacksmith and metal worker. In Yoruba the use of “O” means “a spiritual force has mastered a particular form of wisdom” (Fatunmbi). Ogun therefore means the survival through assertive and aggressive action that is directed toward maintaining survival (Fatunmbi). Most of Nigeria's numerous ethnic cultures have a god of iron and metalworking in their traditional religion.

Mande blacksmiths
The Mande blacksmiths hold important positions in society. Blacksmiths are often called upon by the chief for guidance in major decisions regarding the village. The power of the blacksmith is thought to be so great that they are also feared. Mande Blacksmiths control a force called nyama. This means that they control all energy and power in the village as well as the makeup and workings of the Mande society. The ability to control such a force is not given to just anyone. A single family in the village is designated to produce blacksmiths. The boys from that family are taught the daliluw, “the secret knowledge about the use and nature of nyama”.

“Nyama is the foundation that nourishes the institution of smithing, so that it may nourish society, is the simple axiom that knowledge can be power when properly articulated…. One must first possess it (nyama) in substantial amounts and then acquire the knowledge to manipulate and direct it to capitalize on its potential benefits. Acts that are difficult or dangerous—like hunting, or smelting, and forging iron—demand that a greater responsibility of energy and a higher degree of knowledge be possessed by the actor 
(Perani, Smith 1998: 71).

They begin training at an early age, as an apprentice in order to master the techniques of blacksmithing by the time they reach adulthood and become Mande blacksmiths.

Bamana society
The Bamana society is very similar to the Mande. Bamana society is also endogamous, so blacksmith families are the only blacksmiths in the village and they hold a very high status, due to the extreme power and responsibility that they possess. Bamana Blacksmiths are also experts in divination, amulet making, as well as the practice of medicines due to their extensive knowledge of the Spirit of Ogun. Bamana Blacksmiths are responsible with the well being of the villagers and the safety of the village. This power like the Mande is driven by their control over nyama.

The Bamana training of young blacksmiths lasts about eight years. After completion of the apprenticeship the young blacksmith is ready to begin forging tools, weapons, and ritual masks and staffs, used for ceremonial purposes. “When used actively and sacrificed to, iron staffs continue to gain and radiate power, the power to protect, cure, fight, honor, lead, and repel” (Perani, Smith 1998: 71-72).

Numu blacksmith castes and languages 
In much of West Africa, blacksmiths form castes, called numu in Mande. Because these castes are endogamous (they only marry within the group), they have in several instances become distinct ethnic groups, which when separated from their parent group have even developed distinct languages spoken only by blacksmiths. The best-known of these is Ligbi; others include Tonjon, Natioro, Somyev, and in eastern Africa, Ndo.

References

Joyce, Tom. (2002) The Blacksmith's Art from Africa Life Force at the Anvil.
Perani, Judith. Smith, Fred T. (1998) The Visual Arts of Africa, gender, power, and life cycle rituals. 71-72 p.
Ross, Emma George. "The Age of Iron in West Africa". In Heilbrunn Timeline of Art History. New York: The Metropolitan Museum of Art, 2000–. http://www.metmuseum.org/toah/hd/iron/hd_iron.htm (October 2002)